Iranian Biology Olympiad (IrBO) is an annual multistage competition for Iranian high school students of the age of 17-18 in the field of biology. The first Iranian Biology Olympiad was launched under the auspices of the Ministry of Education, Iran in 1999. Since then, the four winners of the national competitions participate regularly yearly in the International Biology Olympiad (IBO), in which IrBO is a regular member and participant. In Iranian Biology Olympiad individuals compete for their achievements in both theory and practice.

Aims
 
IrBO tried to challenge and stimulate gifted students to expand their talents and to promote their career as biologists. IrBO also is focusing on biology as a valuable subject. In offering a wider syllabus than Iranian National Biology Curriculum, it allows gifted students to demonstrate their theoretical knowledge and practical skills and to be suitably rewarded and publicly recognized by the award of medals and certificates. IrBO also takes advantage of the opportunity provided by IBO to promote the syllabuses and educational trends in biology in different countries.

History

IrBO was found in 1998, when Dr. Mohammad Karamudini, a biology educationist participated in the 9th IBO held in Kiel Germany as an observer from Iran. The first Iranian team participated in the 10th IBO held in Uppsala, Sweden in 1999, in which Iranian students won 2 silver and 1 bronze medals. Here are the results for Iranian team in IBO competitions:

Organization

IrBO is fully supported by The Ministry of Education, Iran. IrBO National committee is responsible for all theoretical and practical exams and the results. Each student will pass 4 round of exams during the national competitions prior to become a team member. 
The IrBO national committee comprises university professors, biology teachers, experts in science education and previous team members. Since 2006, the committee is chaired by Dr. Saman Hosseinkhani, professor of biochemistry at Tarbiat Modares University.

Relation to IBO

Dr. Mohammad Karamudini had been International Biology Olympiad coordinator for Iran since 1998. IrBO is running inside the rules and regulations of International Biology Olympiad, and is a regular participant and a member of it. Iran hosted the International Biology Olympiad in 2018.

See also

 List of biology awards

References

External links
  Iranian Biology Olympiad (IrBO)
  The Young Scholars Club
  The International Biology Olympiad
  Mohammad Karamudini

Youth science
Student quiz competitions
Biology competitions
Biology awards
Education competitions in Iran
Science events in Iran
Annual events in Iran
Recurring events established in 1999